Whistle on the Wind is the first solo album by flute and tin whistle player Joanie Madden.

Tracks

Musicians 
Liam Clancy : Performer, Poetry
Mary Coogan : Guitar
Gabriel Donohue : Bass, Bass (Acoustic), bodhrán, Bouzouki, Engineer, Guitar, Piano
Donny Golden : Dancer
Eileen Ivers : Fiddle
Joanie Madden : Flute, Low Whistle, Producer, Whistle (Human), Whistle (Instrument)
Joe Madden : Accordion
Johnny McDonagh : Bodhrán
Alyssa Pava : Cello
Mark Simos : Guitar
John Williams : Concertina

References

1994 albums
Irish folk music